Baahubali: The Lost Legends is an Indian streaming television animated series that is a part of the Baahubali franchise, produced by Arka Media Works and Graphic India. The series revolves around the young princes Amarendra Baahubali and Bhallaladeva in the Mahishmati kingdom. The series is set before the incidents happened in Baahubali: The Beginning and Baahubali 2: The Conclusion. The first season aired on Amazon Prime Video from 19 April to 11 August 2017. All episodes of season 2 were released on 16 February 2018, Season 3 on 28 April 2018 and all episodes of Season 4 on 10 April 2019 and all episodes of Season 5 on 10 April 2020.

Baahubali - The Lost Legends is set before the Kalakeya invasion depicted in the movie, when Baahubali and Bhallaladeva are still both young princes of Mahishmati. It chronicles two brothers competing to rule the greatest kingdom of its age and the epic adventures they must endure to prove they are worthy to one day wear the crown. Under the watchful eye of Sivagami, and the warrior, Kattappa, one shall rise to be King of the throne, while the other shall become King of the people. The animated series features new, never before revealed stories about the characters from the film including Prince Baahubali, Bhallaladeva, Kattappa and Sivagami, as well as dozens of new characters.

The animated series was created by S. S. Rajamouli, Sharad Devarajan and Arka Mediaworks, who are all Producers, along with Jeevan J. Kang, Graphic India's EVP Creative and the lead character designer for the animated series, along with Graphic India's senior animation writer, Ashwin Pande.

Plot

The series follows princes and cousins Amarendra Baahubali and Bhallaladeva, who work to defend the kingdom of Mahishmati from the forces of evil.

Characters

 Amarendra Baahubali – Baahubali is a boisterous young prince of Mahishmati kingdom and the son of former king Vikramadeva. He is a skilled warrior who cares deeply about the people in his kingdom.
 Bhallaldeva – He's the son of Queen Shivagami and Lord Bijjaladeva. He is also a contender for the throne, and wants to rule the kingdom with an iron fist.

 Sivagami – She is the mother of Bhallaldeva and wife of Bijjaladeva. She rules over the kingdom since Vikramadeva's death, but never occupies the throne herself.
 Kattappa – He is an exceptional warrior and a loyal commander of the Mahishmati kingdom's army. He often comes to the rescue of people in trouble, be it Mahishmati subjects or the royal family itself.
 Bijjaladeva – He is the father of Bhallaldeva and husband of Shivagami. Motivated by greed and power, he wants his son to succeed and claim the throne and doesn't fancy Baahubali at all.
 Pradhan Guru – He is a royal teacher and a skilled fighter as he took on both Baahubali and Bhallaladeva together in a fight employed by Sivagami to train the princes in the art of combat and leadership, however is later proved to be a traitor when both the princes and Shivagami foil his plans of destroying Mahishmati. He is later thrown out of Mahishmati.
 Varaah – Varaah was the King of Rudragni Kingdom. He was an evil prince who had his father killed by his sister Yamagni, and hence came to the throne. He allied with Mahishmati, however he was a clever prince who wanted to capture Mahishmati, however he was killed in that attempt by Yamagni. Varaah also had a village girl as a wife and an illegitimate son, however he kept his identity hidden from them, and their identity from others.
 Yamagni – Yamagni is the sister of Varaah and the Queen of Rudragni Kingdom. Unlike her brother, she is a kind-hearted and brave person, who loves Bahubali, however they have to separate ways. Yamagni had earlier mistakenly killed her father. Yamagni earlier had to work for Pradhan Guru reluctantly, because he blackmailed her. However, after Pradhan Guru is kicked out, she becomes free. Then Rajamata Shivgami again emotional blackmailing to her about Bahubali. She later kills her brother Varaah (who wanted to conquer Mahishmati) and becomes the Queen.
 Aakanksh – He is a good friend of both the princes, Bahubali and Bhallaladeva. However, Bahubali proves to be his true friend whereas Bhallaladeva uses him for his motives and later kills Aakanksh, betraying him.
 Sujata – Sujata is the intelligent princess of the Jwalarajyam Kingdom, a kingdom known to be the 'garden of knowledge' and has no army. Bahubali helps Jwalarajyam defeat the robbers'army and also befriends Sujata, hence forming an alliance with them. Sujata has helped Bahubali numerous times, including the Siege Of Mahishmati by Kalpana Devi.
 Dharmraj – Dharmraj is the self-proclaimed son of Jayadeva, the alleged elder brother of King Somadeva, however his false stories are exposed, and he is overthrown.
 Zoraver – Zoraver is the slave-turned-king of Barigaza who faced many hurdles and overcame many opponents to assemble a large army and have such a high position, whom even Bahubali fails to defeat. However, he is a compassionate and kind king who is impressed with Bahubali's valour and becomes Mahishmati's ally. He helps them to defeat Dharmraj. He has a wife Ranatadevi and a son, Karan Singh.
 Mahabali – Mahabali is the leader of an unnamed tribe and an old friend of Kattappa. He later retires and places his son Bheemdutt as the leader.
 Kalpana Devi – Kalpana Devi is the Queen of Agarta Kingdom. She is a very cruel queen and envious of men because earlier, her loving husband Shrutsen (King of Agarta) had been killed by the ministers who had allied with Bijjaladeva. Her army only consists of warrior women. She also wielded the Hachiman Sword of her husband, Shrutsen. She has previously massacred many kingdoms, including Amaram, Kalekeyas and Zoraver's army. She wages war on Mahishmati for revenge with Bijjala, but fights as a courageous woman and is killed by Shivagami in the battle. She requests Bahubali and Co. to return the Hachiman Sword to Nippon, which they do.
 Paramhans – Paramhans is the king of Amaram Kingdom. He is an ally of Mahishmati (by striking vicious deals with Bhallaladeva) and wants to take revenge with Bahubali who had earlier killed his son for saving Aakanksh due to some reasons. Paramhans and his kingdom is later destroyed by Kalpana Devi.
 Ayesha – Ayesha is the leader of another tribe of sea-pirates. She succeeded as their leader after she mistakenly killed Kaalakhanjar (her father) instead of killing Bahubali when the latter had visited him and they had befriended each other. Hence, she is envious of Bahubali and is Mahishmati's enemy. She joins hands with Kalpana Devi to attack Mahishmati, however realises Bahubali's good nature and again allies with Mahishmati.
 King Torra – King Torra was a warlord in the kingdom of Nippon, and the enemy of another warlord, Ukami. They used to continuously fight each other for winning Nippon, but none would ever win. Torra's army was destroyed by Ukami but they failed to capture him as Bahubali and his friends took him away. Torra and Ukami later met each other for the final fight, in which Ukami and Torra both are killed. Torra's son Shinji becomes the King of Nippon.
 King Ukami – King Ukami was a warlord in the kingdom of Nippon, and the enemy of Torra. They used to continuously fight each other for winning Nippon, but none would win. Ukami destroyed Torra's army but failed to capture him as he was taken away. Ukami and Torra later fight and kill each other. Hence, Shinji becomes the King of Nippon.
 Shinji/Karasu-san – Shinji is the long-lost son of Torra. The former had left Torra because the latter had attacked him in rage when he was a child. Shinji later adopts the name Karasu San, and becomes the leader of the Tengu tribe. He also befriends Bahubali, and later becomes the King of Nippon, wielding the Hachiman Sword.
 Kensai – Kensai is a great warrior, specialised in sword-fighting. He, in the past, wielded the Hachiman Sword, but later found a brave and kind-hearted king, Shrutsen of Agarta Kingdom and gave it to him. Bahubali and Co. come to Nippon to return the sword to its worthy master.

Episodes

Season 1 (2017)

Special (2017)

Season 2 (2018)

Season 3 (2018)

Season 4 (2019)

Season 5 (2020)

Broadcast
The first episode premiered on 19 April 2017 and the other episodes started streaming from 19 May onwards with a new episode releasing every Friday. Season 1 ended on 11 August 2017 with the episode "The Tournament Of Champions Part 2". Season 2 premiered on 16 February 2018 with all 13 episodes releasing same day, All 13 episodes of Season 3 were released on 28 April 2018 and all 16 episodes of season 4 were released on 10 April 2019. All 16 episodes of Season 5 premiered on 10 April 2020.

Colors TV acquired the television rights of the series. The series premiered on Colors on 10 December 2017. In UAE the series premiered on 5 January 2018 on Colors TV ME.

See also
List of Indian animated television series

References

External links
 
 

Baahubali (franchise)
2010s adult animated television series
2017 animated television series debuts
2017 Indian television series debuts
2017 Indian television seasons
2018 Indian television seasons
2019 Indian television seasons
2020 Indian television seasons
Amazon Prime Video original programming
Colors TV original programming
Indian television shows based on films
Family saga television series
Animated television series about dysfunctional families
Animated television series by Amazon Studios
Indian television spin-offs
Indian period television series
Indian epic television series
Television series set in feudal Japan
Martial arts television series
Animated web series
Adult animated web series